Theory and Construction of a Rational Heat Motor (English: Theory and construction of a rational heat motor with the purpose of replacing the steam engine and the internal combustion engines known today) is an essay written by German engineer Rudolf Diesel. It was composed in 1892, and first published by Springer in 1893. A translation into English followed in 1894. One thousand copies of the German first edition were printed. In this essay, Rudolf Diesel describes his idea of an internal combustion engine based on the Carnot cycle, transforming heat energy into kinetic energy using high pressure, with a thermal efficiency of up to 73%, outperforming any steam engine of the time.

Diesel sent copies of his essay to famous German engineers and university professors for spreading and promoting his idea. He received plenty of negative feedback; many considered letting Diesel's heat engine become reality unfeasible, because of the high pressures of 200–300 atm (20.3–30.4 MPa) occurring, which they thought machines of the time could not withstand. Only few found the actual mistake in Diesel's theory: Isothermal-adiabatic compression, which the theory is based on, is impossible. Even with almost isothermal-adiabatic compression, an engine could not operate because of the lean air-fuel mixture. In other words, an engine as described in the essay would require so much compression work that it could not perform any useful work.

Yet, some scientists of the time praised Diesel's idea, which would lead into Maschinenfabrik Augsburg and Krupp Essen forming a consortium for building Diesel's engine. Diesel, who was then ordered to build his own engine, realised his mistake and considered using a modified combustion process. Key changes are the way of compression, which is only adiabatic in the modified combustion process, the pressure, which Diesel reduced significantly, and the fuel injection, where Diesel increased the fuel quantity. In 1897, after four years of work, Diesel had successfully finished his rational heat motor using his modified combustion process. This engine became known as the Diesel engine. Publicly, Diesel never admitted that he had to use a different combustion process from that one he described in his essay, because this would have rendered his heat motor patent obsolete.

Content summary 

Theory and Construction of a Rational Heat Motor has nine chapters in total. The first chapter describes the theory of combustion, and is separated into five individual combustion processes, out of which the third is the constant pressure process used for the rational heat motor. Therefore, it is described in more detail in this article. In the second chapter, Diesel describes how he intends to design and build an engine with an indicated power of 100 PS. With the third chapter, Diesel tries to address using a process with adiabatic compression only; the fourth chapter describes designing a real motor for this modified process. The fifth chapter addresses yet another modified process, with an incomplete expansion phase, but Diesel does not include a design concept. Furthermore, he considers a completely closed cycle in the sixth chapter and using his invention as a refrigerator in the seventh chapter. His theories on how to use a rational heat motor are described in the eighth chapter. The ninth chapter includes additional comments. His additional work Nachträge zur Bröschüre is not included in the original essay, but in newer editions, it serves as a tenth chapter.

Theorie der Verbrennung (Theory of combustion)
Konstruktion des vollkommenen Motors (Construction of the ideal motor)
Erste Abweichung vom vollkommenen Process (First deviation from the ideal process)
Konstruktion des Motors für den abweichenden Process (Construction of the motor for the deviating process)
Andere Abweichungen vom vollkommenenen Process (Additional deviations from the ideal process)
Der neue Motor als geschlossene Maschine (The new motor in a closed cycle)
Der neue Motor als Kälteerzeugungsmaschine (The new motor as a refrigerator)
Anwendungen des neuen Motors (Applications of the new motor)
Schlussbemerkungen (Conclusions)
Nachträge zur Broschüre (Supplement of the brochure)

Theory of combustion and construction of the ideal motor

The principle 

Diesel's idea of a rational heat motor was designing a cycle that would allow maximum heat utilisation, based on the Carnot cycle. To overcome the low efficiency of steam and combustion engines of the time, Diesel wanted to build an entirely new type of internal combustion engine. In the 1890s, regular gas engines were capable of transforming only 6% of the fuel energy into kinetic energy; good triple expansion steam engines were slightly better than that, they could convert 7.2% of the fuel energy into kinetic energy. Diesel said that his rational heat motor has a thermal efficiency of 73%, thus being capable of converting approximately ″6 to 7-times as much″ chemical energy into kinetic energy, meaning that it has an efficiency of approximately 50%. Diesel even claimed that future versions of his motor would have an even higher efficiency.

Despite relying on compression ignition, Diesel says that he never purposely designed his motor with this specific characteristic. In his patent DRP 67 207, Diesel describes that a motor with the best thermal efficiency would automatically have compression ignition. In his 1913 book Die Entstehung des Dieselmotors, he denies that compression ignition is a key feature of his motor:

On page 16 of Theory and Construction of a Rational Heat Motor, Diesel writes that ignition in his rational heat motor takes place either by means of artificial ignition or compression ignition:

The third process 

The Diesel process is a hypothetical constant-pressure model, with four distinct processes, a so-called cycle, meaning that these four distinct processes can be repeated over and over again. These distinct processes are the same processes that can be found in a four-stroke engine: intake, compression, combustion, exhaust. All four strokes combined form the cycle, which is supposed to result in useful work. The Diesel process uses a special compression stroke based on the idea that a gas can be compressed in a combined isothermal-adiabatic way. Isothermal means that the temperature during compression does not change, thus requiring heat dissipation; adiabatic means that the gas changes its volume, but without heat dissipation. This means that there is no waste heat.

For the means of compression, Diesel intended using a notional compression cylinder. This process requires work and consists of four phases:
Intake, sucking in uncompressed air, requiring work.
Compression with an isothermal curve (or a different curve), dissipating heat and requiring work.
Compression with an adiabatic curve, requiring work.
Emitting the combustion air, requiring work.

For the distinct combustion process, Diesel intended using a notional expansion cylinder. Again it consists of four phases:
Gas entering with constant pressure, requiring work.
Combustion with any curve, producing work, dissipating heat.
Expansion of the gas with an adiabatic curve until atmospheric pressure is reached, producing work.
Exhausting the gas, requiring work.

Adding these phases will result in a diagram similar to a Carnot diagram as shown on the right. Because fuel will be added to the gas, the start position 1 will not be identical with the end position 1, meaning that there is always slightly more work required. However, Diesel considered using a very lean air-fuel mixture, thus resulting in the amount of extra work required being insignificant. In theory, the combustion process ends at position 4 of the diagram. But this is not the end of the work formation taking place in the two phases combustion (3–4) and expansion (4–1), as explained. Diesel considered an isothermal expansion phase unfeasible, because it would cause a gigantic expansion cylinder, resulting in a very large and unpractical engine. This is why gas expansion is adiabatic and only taking place until atmospheric pressure is reached. He considered the additional work required, resulting in overall work loss, ″unimportant″, because he considered making a real motor more reasonable than focussing on the best efficiency. This resulted in the original Diesel diagram.

Wrong conclusion 

Diesel's theory had three major problems:

Isothermal-adiabatic compression, which is supposed to result in high efficiency, is not possible; hence, Diesel later revised his process.
To reach a high thermal efficiency, Diesel intended using a high compression of 200–300 atm (20.3–30.4 MPa), which would result in too much friction loss.
As thermal efficiency does not depend on the temperatures, Diesel intended reducing the combustion temperature by using a lean air-fuel mixture of 99.324:1, which would not allow combustion.

In fact, a high compression ratio increases efficiency, however, only to a certain point, because, like Diesel figured, too much heat energy would have to be dissipated and too much friction would occur, which could not be compensated by the engine's work. On the other hand, a compression ratio chosen too low results in insufficient heat utilisation. When designing his theory, Diesel already considered reducing compression to 90 atm (9.1 MPa), which he thought would result in only 5% thermal efficiency loss, but in a significant increase in actual efficiency, yet he recommends increasing pressure as much as possible. His solution for the heat dissipation problem was still wrong: He decided to use more air, resulting in an air-fuel mixture which is too lean. Such an air-fuel mixture cannot provide any work, because it cannot combust, not even with artificial ignition.

Criticism 

As mentioned, Diesel was mostly criticised for his idea of a heat motor, but also received positive feedback. However, most critics did not criticise the theory's flaw, but that Diesel's heat engine used very high amounts of pressure to operate. Diesel himself acknowledged the feedback:

Wilhelm Züblin, engineer of Sulzer, and Professor Alois Riedler came to the conclusion that Diesel's motor could require so much compression work that it could possibly not perform any useful work. In his 1887 work Theorie der Gasmotoren, Otto Köhler had already addressed that an ideal cycle is not suitable for a real motor, coming to the same conclusion as the former. He had foreseen the problem of friction loss rendering the motor work useless and, in a letter addressed to Diesel's friend Venator, he considered the pressure required too high:

Other critics rather feared that the material would not withstand the enormous strain, but otherwise did not criticise the mistake of Diesel's theory:

Others praised Diesel and the theory:

Diesel realising his theory′s flaw 

As Diesel considered Riedler's and Züblin's reactions to his essay relevant, he tried addressing their point that the engine would not perform any useful work. In a letter addressed to Moritz Schröter, dated 13 February 1893, Diesel describes the thermal efficiency of his rational heat motor, assuming maximum losses. He comes to the conclusion that the absolute minimum thermal efficiency is not less than 30.4–31.6 %, which is still more than 2½ times the thermal efficiency of a triple expansion steam engine and 4–5 times the thermal efficiency of a medium size compound steam engine. At this time, Diesel had not yet realised that his rational heat motor would not work: Still trying to figure how to further increase efficiency, he considered increasing the admission period's length by increasing the supposed isotherm length on his motor's ideal diagram, which Diesel believed would result in better efficiency. What he did not understand at the time was that his diagram did not show an isotherm. With an actual isotherm, the amount of input work would have been almost greater than the output work, resulting in a narrow p-V diagram, indicating that the rational heat motor would not perform any work.

It took Diesel several months to figure the problem. He started designing a new combustion process in May 1893 titled „Schlußfolgerungen über die definitiv f. d. Praxis zu wählende Arbeitsmethode des Motors“ (conclusion of the operating principle that definitely has to be chosen for a practical engine); it took until September the same year. By 16 June 1893, before he started the experiments with his engine at the Maschinenfabrik Augsburg, he had realised that the Carnot cycle is practically not possible and that he, therefore, has to change the way his motor works: ″Despite my older contrary statement, the question has to be answered, whether or not combustion processes other than the isothermal process would result in a bigger diagram″ (=actual engine work). Thus, Diesel eventually abandoned his idea of isothermic-adiabatic compression, he later made a note in his journal: ″We must not compress the air in a combined isothermal-adiabatic way, instead, we must only compress it adiabatically″.

To achieve this, Diesel now wanted to raise point 3 in his diagram instead of increasing the length of the admission period 2–3 by reducing injection time. Diesel, who had obtained a patent (DRP 67 207) for a combustion process without significant changes in either pressure or temperature, thought that this patent would also cover constant pressure combustion curves, but to ensure that the changes in his combustion process would also be covered by a patent, he applied for a new additional patent on 29 November 1893, which was later awarded to him (DRP 82 168). Yet again, Diesel made a mistake: Instead of injecting the fuel faster, injecting more fuel would have been the correct solution in this case. When making calculations for a modification of his test engine in September 1893, he compared his test engine with a regular paraffin engine: ″Average paraffin engines have a fuel consumption of approximately 600 g/PSh = 750 cm3/PSh paraffin, thus 7,500 cm3 for 10 PSh. We would have to assume the same quantity of fuel for our engine running at maximum load and 150×60=9000 injections per hour.″ This is how Diesel found out that he has to use an air-fuel ratio of ~14:1 rather than ~100:1 for a working engine. Furthermore, Diesel finally decided to abandon his concept of a high compression pressure in favour of a lower pressure of 30 atm (3 MPa) more suitable for 1890s machines. Correctly, he assumed that lower compression, despite causing less thermal efficiency, would result in less friction, which would allow an engine having a higher total efficiency, than an engine with a greater thermal efficiency but more friction losses:

Publicly, Diesel never admitted his mistakes, despite knowing them and how to overcome them. He did so to save his patent: Publicly admitting that the rational heat motor cannot work would have rendered his patent DRP 67 207 obsolete and therefore destroyed his personal work, because it would have allowed building the Diesel engine without acquiring a licence for his patent.

Deviation from the process 

Diesel feared that possible licencees could get an ″unfavourable impression″ when seeing the high compression pressure figure. Therefore, Diesel addressed several different deviations from the ideal process in chapters 3 and 5 of his essay. By gradually reducing compression temperature, he depicted a gradual reduction in compression pressure. He writes that a pressure reduction from 250 atm (25.3 MPa) to 90 atm (9.1 MPa) would only result in 5% thermal efficiency loss, but an increase in overall efficiency, which is why Diesel figured that there ″cannot be any doubts that the deviating process has to be chosen for the actual motor″. The lowest pressure Diesel considered reasonable is 44 atm (4.5 MPa), resulting in a thermal efficiency of 60%. According to Diesel, at the time materials were already capable of withstanding such high pressure. He also admitted that a pressure of approximately 30 atm (3 MPa) may be used as a last stop-gap solution if higher compression is not possible. During his experiments in Augsburg, Diesel ended up finding out that the ideal compression for the engine is in between 30 and 35 atm (3–3.5 MPa), after he first considered slightly higher values of 30–40 atm (3–4.1 MPa) reasonable. When reducing the compression pressure, Diesel always tried keeping it above the self-ignition temperature of the fuel, which is why he eventually decided to choose 30 atm.

Applications of the motor 

In the eighth chapter, Diesel gives five suggestions how his motor can be used as:

Stationary motor for large-scale industry
Stationary motor for small-scale industry
Motor for locomotives
Motor for trams and lorries
Motor for watercraft

Hellmut Droscha evaluates in the 1991 book Leistung und Weg: Zur Geschichte des MAN-Nutzfahrzeugbaus that Diesel's main intention was designing a motor for small-scale industry. With a Diesel engine, according to Droscha, Diesel thought he could improve the competitiveness of small enterprises. In the 19th century, only larger firms could afford steam engines, as steam engines were economical in bigger quantities only.

Bibliography

External links 

Theory and Construction of a Rational Heat Motor on Google Books

References

Quotes in German language 

Rudolf Diesel

Max Friedrich Gutermuth

Otto Köhler

Eugen Langen

Franz Reuleaux

Moritz Schröter

Gustav Zeuner

1893 non-fiction books